Canoeing at the 1964 Summer Olympics was held between 20 October 1964 and 22 October 1964 on Lake Sagami,  from Sagamiko, Kanagawa, Japan.  There were 7 events, 5 of which were for men and 2 for women.  Both of the women's events were 500 metre kayaking events; there were three kayaking and two canoeing events for men, all of which covered 1000 metres.  The K-4 event for men was introduced to the Olympic program at these Games, replacing the 4×500 metre K-1 event that was raced in the 1960 Games.

The Romanian canoeists garnered the most medals at 5, but did not win a single gold medal.  In that category the Soviet competitors were the most successful, taking three championships.  The German team and the Swedish team each won a pair of golds as well.

Medal table

Medal summary

Men's events

Women's events

References

Canoeing at the 1964 Tokyo Summer Games. sports-reference.com
1964 Summer Olympics official report Volume 2, Part 1. pp. 246–52.
 

 
1964 Summer Olympics events
1964